The blue-headed snouted tree frog or Spix's snouted tree frog (Scinax nebulosus) is a species of frog in the family Hylidae.
It is found in Bolivia, Brazil, French Guiana, Guyana, Suriname, and Venezuela.
Its natural habitats are subtropical or tropical moist lowland forests, moist savanna, intermittent freshwater marshes, pastureland, rural gardens, and heavily degraded former forest.
It is threatened by habitat loss.

References

nebulosus
Amphibians described in 1824
Taxonomy articles created by Polbot